Lazharia is a district in Tissemsilt Province, Algeria. It was named after its capital, Lazharia.

Municipalities
The district is further divided into 3 municipalities:
Lazharia
Boukaïd 
Larbaâ

Districts of Tissemsilt Province